Reich Remixed is a remix album of music by the American composer Steve Reich. It was released in 1999 by Nonesuch Records and features tracks produced by various American, British, and Japanese DJs.

Track listing
 "Music for 18 Musicians (Coldcut remix)" – 6:03
 "Eight Lines (Howie B remix)" – 8:12
 "The Four Sections (Andrea Parker remix)" – 6:22
 "Megamix (Tranquility Bass remix)" – 9:36
 "Drumming (Mantronik Maximum Drum Formula)" – 4:02
 "Proverb (Nobukazu Takemura remix)" – 7:44
 "Piano Phase (D*Note's Phased and Konfused mix)" – 5:05
 "City Life (DJ Spooky that Subliminal Kid Open Circuit)" – 6:58
 "Come Out (Ken Ishii remix)" – 7:15

Bonus track:

 "The Desert Music (FreQ Nasty & B.L.I.M. Remix)" – 7:22

Track 10 only appeared on the first pressing; its presence was only noted with a sticker on top of the shrink wrap. The United Kingdom and Ireland version of the CD had a different track order.

Charts

References

Further reading

External links
 
 
 

1999 remix albums
Nonesuch Records albums
Steve Reich albums